Beichen District is a district of the municipality of Tianjin, People's Republic of China. Before June 1992, the district was named Beijiao District, reflectings its position in the northern suburbs of Tianjin. As the city expanded, it gradually became part of the urban core and was renamed to Beichen.

China National Highway 103 goes through the heart of the district. Beichen District also hosts the North Canal, a branch of the Hai River.

Administrative divisions
There are 4 subdistricts and 9 towns in the district:

Transportation

Metro
Beichen is currently served by two metro lines operated by Tianjin Metro:

  - Guojiuchang, Xihengdi, Liuyuan
  - Yixingfu, Tianshili, Huabeijituan, Fengchanhe, Xiaodian

Climate 

Beichen District has a humid continental climate (Köppen climate classification Dwa).

References

External links 
 Official site 

Districts of Tianjin